Albernaz is a surname. Notable people with the surname include:

Craig Albernaz (born 1982), American baseball coach
João Teixeira Albernaz I (late 16th century– 1662), Portuguese cartographer, brother of Pedro
Pedro Teixeira Albernaz (1595–1662), Portuguese cartographer
Rosa Albernaz, Portuguese politician
Benone de Arruda Albernaz (1933–1992), Brazilian criminal